Osnes may refer to:

People
 Asbjørn Osnes (1932–2011), Norwegian ski jumper
 Knut Osnes (1922–2015), Norwegian football player and coach
 Laura Osnes (born 1985), American actress and singer known
 Tarald Osnes Brautaset (born 1946), Norwegian diplomat

Places
 Osnes, Ardennes, commune in the Ardennes department in northern France
 Osnes, Rogaland, Norway